Letters from the Lost: A Memoir of Discovery is a non-fiction memoir, written by Canadian writer Helen Waldstein Wilkes, first published in December 2009 by Athabasca University Press. In the book, the author chronicles her discoveries after reading a box of letters she had never before seen. Her Jewish parents had fled Czechoslovakia in April 1939 to seek haven in Canada. Once in place, they corresponded with family and friends, encouraging them to escape the mounting peril that Hitler had envisioned as the Final Solution. Wilkes would learn that shortly after her parents migration, the ability to flee had been curtailed; and that each letter, compounded the historical anguish the writers were forced to endure.

Awards and honours
Letters from the Lost received the "Alberta Readers' Choice Award" in 2011, for "the best fiction or narrative non-fiction book written by an Alberta author." The book also received the 2011 "Edna Staebler Award for Creative Non-Fiction".

See also
List of Edna Staebler Award recipients

Translations
 "Das Schlimmste aber war der Judenstern." Das Schicksal meiner Familie. Transl. Christina Goldt, Ingrid Hildebrand, Margarete Kollmar, Angelika Meirhofer, Ilse Windhoff. Osburg, Hamburg 2014 (German)

References

External links
 Full text, free copy from the editor, Creative Commons License 
CBC Canada, Listen to Helen Waldstein Wilkes' interview with CBC Daybreak Alberta. Retrieved November 23, 2012

Canadian memoirs
Jewish Canadian literature
2009 non-fiction books
Holocaust historical documents
Athabasca University Press books